Pat Cooper (born Pasquale Caputo; July 31, 1929) is an American actor and comedian.

Life and career
His father Michael Caputo was a bricklayer from Mola di Bari, Italy and his mother, Louise Gargiulo was born in Brooklyn, New York, where Cooper was also born and raised. Cooper often makes reference to his Italian heritage in his stand up comedy routines.

Cooper started performing in the 1950s, originally for primarily Italian-American audiences. His big break came in 1963 on The Jackie Gleason Show. Afterwards, he played top nightclubs such as the Copacabana (nightclub), 500 Club, Latin Casino, Palumbo's, Atlantic City and Las Vegas Hotels and casinos. Cooper appeared on the same shows as Frank Sinatra, Jimmy Durante, Ella Fitzgerald, Tony Bennett, Sergio Franchi, Sammy Davis Jr., Connie Francis, Bobby Vinton, Bobby Darin, Tony Martin, Liza Minnelli and many others.

On May 2, 1969, Cooper and singer Jimmy Roselli premiered in their two-man show at Broadway's Palace Theatre in New York.
He has performed at many celebrity roasts at the New York Friars Club which he also played in an episode of Seinfeld titled "The Friar's Club" and was also a frequent guest on many radio shows, most notably The Howard Stern Show (where he had an open invitation to drop in whenever he wanted, and he eventually got so loud and angry he walked out of the studio), Imus in the Morning and Opie and Anthony.

Billboard gave his album Our Hero (1965) a special merit review and said that it "does for the Italian-American community what Jackie Mason did for the Jewish-American community"   The following year it stated that his Spaghetti Sauce and Other Delights (1966), an album which consists of one side of spoken comedy and one side of parody songs, was  stronger than Our Hero.

Cooper had a legendary appearance on the Tom Snyder "Tomorrow - Coast To Coast" Show on March 6, 1981, in which he decried "headliners" in the club circuit who often worked with comics as their second act.

Cooper played fictional mobster Salvatore Masiello in the film Analyze This and in the sequel Analyze That, as well as playing lawyer, John Bruno in the 2003 film This Thing of Ours. He has also guest-starred on television series such as Vega$ (episode: "Deadly Blessings"), Charlie's Angels (episode: "Stuntwomen Angels"), It's a Living (episodes: "You're Not Old, You're Fired" and "Horsing Around") and L.A. Law (episode: "Foreign Co-respondent").

He was an occasional contributor to Colin Quinn's late-night show on Comedy Central, Tough Crowd with Colin Quinn. In 2005, he released a DVD called You're Always Yelling and in 2010, he co-authored with Steve Garrin and Rich Herschlag his autobiography called How Dare You Say How Dare Me!.

Personal life

Pat Cooper has been married three times.  He has two biological children (Michael and Louise Caputo) from his first marriage to Dolores Nola and one adopted daughter (Patti Jo Cooper) from his second marriage to singer Patti Prince. Pat Cooper has five grandchildren: two grandsons and three granddaughters. In 2018, he married his third wife, Emily Conner, who he met at the New York Friars Club in 2010. She was a theater producer and the daughter of Diane Decker, one of the original members of The Serendipity Singers.  Pat Cooper is retired and is now living in Las Vegas, Nevada. He has publicly feuded with his children on his radio appearances and is estranged from all members of his adopted and biological families.

Filmography

References

External links
Pat Cooper's Autobiography
Kliph Nesteroff interviews Pat Cooper, February 16, 2011 - Part One
Kliph Nesteroff interviews Pat Cooper, February 16, 2011 - Part Two

1929 births
Living people
American stand-up comedians
American male film actors
American male television actors
American radio personalities
People from Brooklyn
American people of Italian descent
Comedians from New York (state)